André Richer (24 January 1928 – 11 April 2018) was a Brazilian rower. He competed in the men's coxed four event at the 1956 Summer Olympics.

References

External links
 

1928 births
2018 deaths
Brazilian male rowers
Olympic rowers of Brazil
Rowers at the 1956 Summer Olympics
Place of birth missing